Stark Township may refer to:

Stark Township, Brown County, Minnesota
Stark Township, Hickory County, Missouri

See also
Starkstown, an early name of Dunbarton, New Hampshire
Stark (disambiguation)

Township name disambiguation pages